Julien-Jean-Guillaume Conan (born 1860 in Guern) was a French clergyman and Archbishop of the Roman Catholic Archdiocese of Port-au-Prince. He was ordained in 1903. He was appointed bishop in 1903. He died in 1940.

References 

1860 births
1940 deaths
French Roman Catholic bishops
People from Morbihan
Roman Catholic archbishops of Port-au-Prince